Bembidion bipunctatum is a species of ground beetle native to Europe.

References

Bembidion
Beetles described in 1761
Beetles of Europe
Taxa named by Carl Linnaeus